Stipe Modrić (born May 8, 1979) is a Slovenian professional basketball coach who is the assistant coach for Ilirija of the Slovenian Second League. 

Born in Sinj to a Croat father, Modrić played at the position of forward and power forward. During his career, he had played for Alkar, Union Olimpija, Ludwigsburg, Geoplin Slovan, Cedevita, Anwil Włocławek and Astrum Levice.

On December 11, 2012, he returned to Geoplin Slovan.

Modrić won the 2000–01 and 2001–02 Slovenian national championship with Olimpija. He also won the 2000, 2001 and 2002 Slovenian national cup with Olimpija, and won the 2001–02 ABA Goodyear League with the same team. He played in the 2000 Slovenian All Star game and was an occasional member of the Slovenia national team.

References

1979 births
Living people
People from Sinj
Slovenian men's basketball players
Cholet Basket players
Croatian men's basketball players
Forwards (basketball)
KD Slovan players
KK Cedevita players
KK Olimpija players
KK Włocławek players
KD Ilirija players
Slovenian people of Croatian descent
KK Alkar players